Parecbasis is a genus of freshwater fish in the family Characidae. It contains the single species Parecbasis cyclolepis, found in Bolivia, Brazil and Peru.

References
 

Characidae
Monotypic fish genera
Fish of South America
Fish of Bolivia
Fish of Brazil
Fish of Peru
Taxa named by Carl H. Eigenmann
Fish described in 1914